Felix Guilbe Colón (March 2, 1924 – June 20, 2010) was a Puerto Rican professional baseball outfielder in the American Negro leagues in the 1940s.

A native of Ponce, Puerto Rico, Guilbe was the brother of fellow Negro leaguer Juan Guilbe. Younger brother Felix pitched in the Negro leagues for the Baltimore Elite Giants in 1946 and 1947. He died in Ponce in 2010 at age 86.

References

External links
 and Seamheads
 Felix Guilbe at Negro League Baseball Players Association

1924 births
2010 deaths
Baltimore Elite Giants players
Puerto Rican baseball players
Baseball outfielders